is a video game developed and published by Sega. It was released in Japan for the Master System in 1987.

Gameplay

This video game uses a special paddle controller. The player has to drive Alex through an obstacle course and get to the finishing point without other competitors trying to push him off his bike. There are five scenes to complete. The next scene all depends on one of the many exit points the player finishes at. Alex has a vitality meter to indicate how many crashes and bumping he can take. He loses the race if the meter is empty.

External links

1987 video games
BMX mass media
Cycling video games
Japan-exclusive video games
Racing video games
Sega video games
Master System games
Master System-only games
Alex Kidd games
Video games developed in Japan